In symbolic dynamics and related branches of mathematics, a shift space or subshift is a set of infinite words that represent the evolution of a discrete system. In fact, shift spaces and symbolic dynamical systems are often considered synonyms. The most widely studied shift spaces are the subshifts of finite type.

Notation 
Let A be a finite set of states.
The shift operator  acts on an infinite or bi-infinite word by shifting all symbols to the left, i.e.,
 for all n.
In the following we choose  and thus speak of infinite words, but all definitions are naturally generalizable to the bi-infinite case.

Definition 
Thus a set  is a subshift if and only if
 for any (pointwise) convergent sequence  of elements of S, the limit  also belongs to S; and
 .

Some authors use the term subshift for a set of infinite words that is just invariant under the shift, and reserve the term shift space for those that are also closed.

Characterization and sofic subshifts 

In particular, if X is finite then S is called a subshift of finite type and more generally when X is a regular language, the corresponding subshift is called sofic.

Examples 
The first trivial example of shift space (of finite type) is the full shift .

Let . The set of all infinite words over A containing at most one b is a sofic subshift, not of finite type. The set of all infinite words over A whose b form blocks of prime length is not sofic (this can be shown by using the pumping lemma).

The space of infinite strings in two letters,  is called Bernoulli process.  It is isomorphic to the Cantor set.

The bi-infinite space of strings in two letters,  is commonly known as the Baker's map, or rather is homomorphic to the Baker's map.

See also 
 Tent map
 Bit shift map
 Gray code

References

Further reading 
 
 
 
 

Symbolic dynamics
Dynamical systems
Combinatorics on words